The Health Protection (Coronavirus, International Travel and Operator Liability) (England) Regulations 2021 (SI 2021/582) was a statutory instrument (SI) enacted on 17 May 2021 by the Secretary of State for Health and Social Care, Matt Hancock, in response to the COVID-19 pandemic, revoking and replacing The Health Protection (Coronavirus, International Travel) (England) Regulations 2020 (SI 2020/568).

The regulations as initially enacted introduced a new traffic light system of country categorisation (similar but not identical to the revoked Exempt / Not exempt / Red list categories of SI 2020/568), with most international travellers arriving in England being placed into one of three categories depending on the highest risk-level country (Green / Amber / Red) that they had been in over the preceding 10 days. Restrictions including mandatory COVID-19 testing, home self-isolation, and hotel isolation were applied depending on the traveller's category. Direct air and/or boat journeys from certain high risk countries have also been prohibited at various times.

On 4 October 2021, the regulations were significantly amended to abolish the traffic light system, with only the Red list category being retained. Travellers (unless exempt) from Red list countries remained subject to stringent measures, including mandatory hotel quarantine, while travellers from all other countries were subject to lesser levels of restriction. From 4 October the number of countries on the Red list was generally though not consistently reduced, and after 15 December no Red list countries remained. Since that date, non-exempt travellers from all countries have in practice been treated in the same way.

From 7 January 2022 fully vaccinated travellers no longer needed to possess notification of a negative test result on arrival in England. On day 2 after arrival a test was required, but was no longer any requirement to self-isolate while awaiting the result.

On 11 February, all testing and self-isolation requirements for fully vaccinated travellers were abolished. Non-eligible travellers still had to pre-book a day 2 test, but did not need to self-isolate on arrival.

The regulations were revoked on 18 March 2022.

Legal basis and commencement 
The Health Protection (Coronavirus, International Travel) (England) Regulations 2020 (SI 2020/568) were introduced by way of a statutory instrument made by the Secretary of State for Health and Social Care, Matt Hancock, using emergency powers available to him under sections 45B, 45F(2) and 45P(2) of the Public Health (Control of Disease) Act 1984. The regulations came into effect on 17 May 2021.

Applicability 
The regulations apply to most international travellers who arrive in England having begun their journey outside the Common Travel Area (CTA) (Scotland, Wales, Northern Ireland, the Republic of Ireland, the Channel Islands and Isle of Man) as well as to travellers arriving from within the CTA who have been outside the CTA in the 10 days preceding their arrival. Travellers arriving in England who have remained entirely within the CTA during the preceding 10 days are mostly not affected by these regulations.

Initially, different rules applied to different categories of arrival, depending on the highest COVID-19 risk country that the person had been in during the preceding 10 days. Prior to 4 October 2021, this was based on Red, Amber and Green country lists. From 4 October 2021 it was based on a Red list of countries only and, for travellers who had not been in a Red list country, on their vaccine status and country of vaccination. From 7 December the rules were tightened to require all non-exempt travellers over the age of 12, regardless of vaccination status, to take an approved test no more than two days before their final departure for England. 

Since 15 December 2021, with no countries remaining on the Red list, arrivals from all countries have in practice been treated equally. Different restrictions apply depending on whether the traveller is considered 'eligible' (roughly, fully vaccinated) or not.

'Eligible traveller' and Red list rules, from 4 October 2021 
Prior to 4 October 2021, a 'traffic light' set of countries/territories had been maintained. On that date the concept was abandoned, with only the Red list being kept. The 4 October amendments introduced a scheme based on a new category of 'eligible traveller', arriving from a non Red list country and to whom lesser restrictions apply. Travellers from all countries still have to provide information on a passenger locator form in prescribed format. Special rules (not covered by this article) continue to apply to travellers who are considered 'workers'.

Definition of 'eligible traveller' 
An 'eligible traveller' is an arrival who:
 has not in the preceding 10 days been in a Red list country, and
 who meets any of these requirements:
 (a) can prove that they have completed a course of an authorised vaccine at least 14 days earlier, either in the UK or (for US residents only) in the US. Initially, 'authorised vaccine' meant only a vaccine approved for use in the UK or in a country regulated by the European Medicine Agency (EU member states, Andorra, Iceland, Lichtenstein, Monaco, Norway, San Marino, Vatican City), Swissmedic (Switzerland), the Food and Drug Administration (US), Australia The Therapeutic Goods Administration (Australia) or Health Canada (Canada). Additional countries were add later, and from 1 November 2021 the country of vaccination restriction was lifted so that vaccines from any country could be considered authorised.
 (b) is or has been part of a UK or US clinical trial
 (c) can provide proof that a registered medical practitioner has advised against vaccination
 (d) is a UK resident under the age of 18
 (e) can prove that they have completed a course of a vaccine at least 14 days earlier under the UK vaccine rollout overseas scheme. From 11 October 2021 this can be via an EU Digital Covid Certificate.

'Eligible traveller' rules

4 October to 24 October 2021 
On arrival in England, an eligible traveller (unless exempt) had to possess a booking for a COVID-19 day 2 PCR test, and subsequently complete that test. A traveller whose day 2 test result was positive or inconclusive, or who did not complete the test, had to self-isolate for a period of 10 or 14 days. Children were exempt.

24 October to 30 November 2021 
On 24 October the rules were relaxed to allow eligible travellers the option of using an approved lateral flow device rather than PCR for the day 2 test.

30 November to 7 December 2021 
Following the emergence of the Omicron variant, the regulations were tightened again from 30 November to require eligible travellers to book and undertake a PCR test by the second day after arrival, and to self-isolate until they received a negative result.

7 December 2021 to 7 January 2022 
The rules were tightened on 7 December to require all non-exempt travellers over the age of 12, regardless of vaccination status, to possess on arrival notification of a negative result from an approved test (eg PCR, LFD or antigen) taken no more than two days before their final departure for England. The self-isolation requirement continued.

7 January to 11 February 2022 
The rules were relaxed once more on 7 January 2022. From that date, eligible travellers no longer needed to possess notification of a negative test result on arrival, on day 2 after arrival they could take a lateral flow rather than a PCR test, and they no longer needed to self-isolate while awaiting the result. If a lateral flow test was used which gave a positive result on day 2, a confirmatory PCR test then had to be taken, followed if necessary by self isolation.

11 February 2022 – 
On 11 February, testing and self-isolation requirements for eligible travellers were abolished.

Non 'eligible traveller' rules

4 October to 15 December 2021 
Non eligible travellers who had been in a Red list country during the preceding 10 days still had to follow the pre-4 October 2021 Red list arrival rules, including mandatory hotel isolation. Other non-eligible arrivals had to pre-book tests and to self-isolate as described below.

7 December to 15 December 2021 
From 7 December 2021 an approved pre-travel test (eg PCR, LFD or antigen) had to be taken by all travellers, regardless of vaccination status, no more than two days prior to the final leg of the journey to England. All such arrivals had to pre-book tests as described below. Non Red list travellers had to self-isolate, while Red list travellers were subject to mandatory hotel isolation.

15 December 2021 to 11 February 2022 
Following removal of all countries from the Red list on 15 December 2021, the distinction between Red list and other non-CTA countries disappeared. All non-eligible arrivals had to pre-book tests and to self-isolate as described below.

11 February 2022 – 17 March 2022 
Non-eligible travellers no longer have to pre-book a day 8 test, nor to self-isolate on arrival. A day 2 test is still required.

Requirement to pre-book tests 
Travellers who are required to do so must at their own expense pre-book a 'testing package' comprising day 2 and day 8 PCR tests (a day 2 test only from 11 February 2022). Younger children are exempt, and there is an extensive list of other exemptions and special cases.

Self-isolation rules 
Travellers who are required to self-isolate must do so at home or some other approved location normally for at least 10 days, or longer if a test returns a positive result. In some circumstances optional private tests are permitted which, if negative, allowed early release. The traveller does not need to remain in isolation during that period from any person they live with at home, nor from anyone with whom they were travelling.

People who are self-isolating are not allowed to leave their place of self-isolation except:

 to travel to leave England, provided they do so directly
 to seek medical or veterinary assistance, or to obtain a COVID-19 test where required
 to fulfil a legal obligation such as to attend court, satisfy bail conditions, or participate in legal proceedings
 to avoid injury or illness or to escape a risk of harm
 on compassionate grounds, such as attending certain funerals
 to move to a different place of self-isolation
 in exceptional circumstances, for example to obtain basic necessities such as food or medical supplies where these cannot be obtained in any other manner
to access critical public services.

Red list timeline from 4 October 2021

4 to 11 October 2021 (Red list) 
The Red list was not amended on 4 October 2021, and remained as indicated by the rows coloured red in the table for the period up to 4 October 2021 (see below section) until 11 October, namely: 

 Afghanistan, Angola, Argentina, Bolivia, Botswana, Brazil, Burundi, Cape Verde, Chile, Democratic Republic of Congo, Costa Rica, Cuba, Eritrea, Eswatini, Ethiopia, French Guiana, Georgia, Guyana, Indonesia, Lesotho, Malawi, Mayotte, Mexico, Mongolia, Montenegro, Mozambique, Myanmar, Namibia, Nepal, Paraguay, Philippines, Réunion, Rwanda, Seychelles, Sierra Leone, Somalia, South Africa, Sudan, Suriname, Tanzania, Thailand, Trinidad and Tobago, Tunisia, Uganda, Uruguay, Zambia, Zimbabwe

11 October to 1 November 2021 (Red list) 
On 11 October, the above 47 countries were removed, leaving just seven Red list countries:
 Colombia, Dominican Republic, Ecuador, Haiti, Panama, Peru and Venezuela (each having been on the Red list under the new rules since 4 October)

1 to 26 November 2021 (no Red list countries) 
On 1 November, all of the remaining countries were removed from the Red list, and from that date until 26 November 2021 there were no countries to which Red list rules applied. However, the Red list regulations themselves still remained in existence in case any countries needed to be re-added in the future.

26 to 28 November 2021 (Red list) 
Following identification of variant of concern SARS-CoV-2 Omicron, it was announced on 25 November 2021 that the Red list would be brought back into use, and that South Africa, Namibia, Zimbabwe, Botswana, Lesotho and Eswatini would be added. Regulations introduced the next day banned direct flights to England from those countries. A temporary transitional provision allowed anyone arriving before 04:00 on 28 November who had during the preceding 10 days been in one of those countries to self-isolate at a location of their choice. After that time the full Red list restrictions applied, including mandatory hotel isolation.

28 November to 6 December 2021 (Red list) 
Following further concerns regarding the spread of the Omicron variant in Southern Africa, Angola, Malawi, Mozambique and Zambia were added to the Red list on 28 November.

6 December to 15 December 2021 (Red list) 
Nigeria was added to the Red list on Monday 6 December 2021.

15 December 2021 – (no Red list countries) 
On 15 December all countries were again removed from the Red list, and since that date arrivals from all countries have been treated in the same way.

List of countries and territories, 4 October to 15 December 2021
The table below shows countries that were on the Red list between 4 October and 15 December 2021. Since 15 December 2021 there have been no countries on the Red list.

'Traffic light' rules, 17 May 2021 to 4 October 2021

Green list arrivals, 17 May to 4 October 2021 

 The rules in this section were abolished on 4 October 2021.

Places listed in schedule 1 to the Regulations, legally "Category 1 countries and territories", were commonly referred to as the "Green list". The following rules applied to all arrivals (unless exempt) who had been in a Green list country during the preceding 10 days, and who had NOT been in any Amber or Red list country.

Requirement to provide information 
Travellers had to provide information on a passenger locator form in prescribed format which must be completed on arrival into England or, for passengers on the Eurotunnel Shuttle, at immigration control in Calais. Alternatively, passengers could complete the form up to 48 hours in advance.

The required information included the passenger's personal data, journey details, and details of the place they intended to stay during the next 10 days or to self-isolate if required. COVID-19 testing details could also be required.

There were exemptions for certain government contractors, foreign government officials, transport workers, seamen, aircrew, channel tunnel workers, transit passengers, road hauliers, essential and emergency workers, offshore oil workers, some specialist, clinical and medical workers, seasonal workers, people who have to travel for work at least weekly, and elite sportspeople. Also exempt were members of diplomatic or consular missions, representatives of international organisations afforded privileges and immunities in the UK, diplomatic and consular couriers, government representatives on official business, and some members of their households.

Requirement to possess negative test result 
On arrival in England (or at immigration control in Calais), travellers had on request to present notification of a negative COVID-19 test result. The test had to be of an approved type, and administered no more than three days earlier.

There were exemptions for children under the age of 11, certain government contractors, foreign government officials, seamen, aircrew, channel tunnel workers, and road hauliers.

Requirement to pre-book a day 2 test 
Travellers had at their own expense to pre-book an additional COVID-19 test, to be taken on day 2 after arrival. If the result of the test was negative, there were no further restrictions and no requirement to self-isolate. If positive, the person had to self-isolate as described below in connection with Amber country arrivals.

Children under the age of five were exempt from the testing requirement, and there was an extensive list of other exemptions and special cases.

Amber list arrivals 

 The self-isolation rules and exemptions of this section were largely retained by the 4 October 2021 amendments, re-purposed as rules for non Red list non eligible travellers.

The "Category 2 countries and territories" of the regulations as initially enacted were countries not in the Common Travel Area that were not listed in schedules 1 or 3, these were commonly referred to as the "Amber list". Any country not mentioned by name was automatically deemed to be on the Amber list. The following rules applied to all arrivals (unless exempt) who had been in an Amber list country during the preceding 10 days, and who had NOT been in any Red list country.

Requirement to provide information 
Same as arrivals from Green list countries.

Requirement to possess negative test result 
Same as arrivals from Green list countries. 

From 7 December 2021 a pre-travel test had to be taken by all travellers, regardless of vaccination status, no more than two days prior to the final leg of the journey to England.

Requirement to pre-book day 2 and day 8 tests 
Travellers had at their own expense to pre-book a 'testing package' comprising additional day 2 and day 8 COVID-19 tests. Children under the age of five were exempt, and there was an extensive list of other exemptions and special cases.

Self-isolation 
Travellers had to self-isolate at home or some other approved location normally for at least 10 days, or longer if either of the tests returned a positive result. In some circumstances optional private tests were permitted which, if negative, allowed early release. The traveller did not need to remain in isolation during that period from any person they live with at home, nor from anyone with whom they were travelling.

People who were self-isolating were not allowed to leave their place of self-isolation except:

 to travel to leave England, provided they do so directly
 to seek medical or veterinary assistance, or to obtain a COVID-19 test where required
 to fulfil a legal obligation such as to attend court, satisfy bail conditions, or participate in legal proceedings
 to avoid injury or illness or to escape a risk of harm
 on compassionate grounds, such as attending certain funerals
 to move to a different place of self-isolation
 in exceptional circumstances, for example to obtain basic necessities such as food or medical supplies where these cannot be obtained in any other manner
to access critical public services.

Some road hauliers could self-isolate in the sleeping cab of a goods vehicle, in which case they could also go outside for sanitary reasons, to take exercise, and to inspect, load or refuel the vehicle.

Amber list exemptions from 19 July 2021 
From 19 July 2021 some arrivals from Amber list were exempted from the need to self-isolate. To be exempt, the arrival must not during the preceding 10 days have visited any Red list country, and must have completed a course of vaccination in the UK or as part of the UK roll-out overseas, the final dose being at least 14 days earlier.  Children normally resident in the UK were also exempt, as were adults who had been involved in a UK clinical vaccine trial. Exempt Amber list arrivals also benefited from reduced testing requirements, and did not need book or undertake a day 8 test.

Between 19 July and 8 August 2021, travellers who had visited Metropolitan France within the preceding 10 days were treated differently from other Amber list arrivals, in that the exemption mentioned in the previous paragraph did not apply to them. On 8 August, Metropolitan France was brought back into line with the other Amber list countries.

Amber list exemptions from 2 August 2021 
On 2 August 2021 further self-isolation exemptions became available to travellers who had completed an approved course of vaccine outside the UK, specifically those regulated by the European Medicine Agency (EU member states, Andorra, Iceland, Lichtenstein, Monaco, Norway, San Marino, Vatican City), Swissmedic (Switzerland), or the Food and Drug Administration (US). Also exempt were children ordinarily resident in any of the countries listed. The US-based exemption for adults applied only to travellers who were "ordinarily resident in the US".

Amber list exemptions from 22 September 2021 
From 22 September 2021 there were new exemptions for foreign police force officials, people on cruise ships who did not disembark, seasonal poultry workers, performing arts professionals, persons engaged in film or high end TV, and road haulage support workers.

Red list arrivals 

 The quarantine rules of this section were largely retained by the 4 October 2021 amendments, re-purposed as rules for Red list non eligible travellers.  Following removal of all of remaining countries from the Red list on 1 November, and again on 15 December, there are no countries to which the following Red list rules currently apply.

The countries listed in schedule 3 to the regulations, legally "Category 3 countries and territories", were commonly referred to as the "Red list". The following rules applied to all arrivals (unless exempt) who had been in or transited through a Red list country during the preceding 10 days.

Ports of entry 
Travellers had to arrive at one of the approved airports, namely Heathrow, Gatwick, London City, Birmingham, Farnborough, Bristol, or any military airfield or port. London Biggin Hill (general aviation) was added to this list on 8 June 2021.

Requirement to provide information 
Same as arrivals from Green list countries.

Requirement to possess negative test result 
Initially, same as arrivals from Green list countries. But after the Green list was abolished, Red list travellers were still required on arrival in England to be in possession of notification of a negative COVID-19 test result. The test had to be of an approved type, and administered no more than three days earlier. From 7 December 2021 the pre-travel PCR test had to be taken by all travellers no more than two days prior to the final leg of the journey to England.

Requirement to pre-book a 'managed self-isolation package' 
Travellers had to be in possession of a 'managed self-isolation package' comprising: (a) a booking for approved quarantine accommodation, (b) a booking for approved transport to that accommodation, and (c) bookings for COVID-19 tests at days 2 and day 8 after arrival.

Self-isolation in designated quarantine accommodation 
At the quarantine accommodation the traveller had to isolate for at least 10 days, but if either test was missed or did not return a negative result the quarantine period was extended. Travellers required to isolate could do so together with anyone with whom they were travelling.

Travellers normally had to remain in their own room, and could not leave it except:
 to travel directly to a port to leave the Common Travel Area
 to fulfil a legal obligation
 to take exercise
 to visit a dying person or attend a funeral
 in other exceptional circumstances such as medical assistance, to access critical public services, to escape risk of harm
 to access urgent veterinary services.

Leaving for the purpose of exercise, to visit a dying person, or attend a funeral required prior permission from an authorised person.

There were exemptions for certain government contractors, foreign government officials, transport workers, seaman, aircrew, channel tunnel workers, transit passengers, road hauliers (depending on transit countries), essential and emergency workers, offshore oil workers, some specialist, clinical and medical workers, and elite sportspeople. Also exempt were members of diplomatic or consular missions, diplomatic and consular couriers, government representatives on official business, and some members of their households. Special rules applied to people arriving to take up a job as an NHS nurse.

Prohibited and restricted direct routes 
Direct air and boat journeys from some very high risk countries were prohibited until 8 June, on which date some restricted direct flights were again permitted, but were required to land at arrive at Heathrow or Birmingham airports. The list of countries to which this applies has been regularly amended. Travellers arriving from such countries had to comply with all of the Red country arrival rules.

List of countries and territories, 17 May to 4 October 2021 
The table below shows the countries and territories that were specifically named prior to the 4 October 2021 amendments. Most of the restrictions did not apply to arrivals into England from within the Common Travel Area (Ireland, Northern Ireland, Scotland, Wales, the Channel Islands and Isle of Man) unless the person had been outside the CTA in the preceding 10 days. Any other country not specifically listed was deemed to be on the Amber list.

The starting dates shown are those on which these regulations (SI 2021/582) first applied. For many countries there were prior restrictions already in place under the preceding regulations, The Health Protection (Coronavirus, International Travel) (England) Regulations 2020 (SI 2020/568).

The table incorporates amendments to the regulations up to 4 October 2021, with the colours indicating the situation immediately prior to the abolition of the traffic light lists on that date. For 4 October 2021 and later amendments, see separate main section.

Offences and enforcement 
The regulations include an extensive list of penalties for breach of up to £10,000. They also create a wide variety of criminal offences under which offenders may be prosecuted.

Review and expiry 
The regulations were required to be reviewed every 28 days. They were originally intended to expire on 16 May 2022, but in the event were revoked on 18 March 2022.

List of amendments by date

References

Bibliography

External links 
 Guidance: Red, amber and green list rules for entering England – Department for Transport, 7 May 2021, updated 8 June
 Guidance: Travel abroad from England during coronavirus – Department for Transport, 22 June 2021

Statutory Instruments of the United Kingdom
2021 in England
COVID-19 pandemic in England
Public health in the United Kingdom
2021 in British law
Law associated with the COVID-19 pandemic in the United Kingdom